Opal Carew is the pseudonym of Elizabeth Batten-Carew, a Canadian erotic romance novelist. She also writes science fiction under the name, Amber Carew.

Biography 
Carew was born as Elizabeth Batten in Toronto and was the youngest of five siblings. She majored in math in college, and then worked as a software developer, before resigning shortly after the birth of her second child in the early 1990s to focus on writing. After she began writing, she found that it was important to her to create erotic books that portray sex in a positive light. She wants women to feel good about enjoying sexual feelings.

Carew lives in Stittsville and has two children.

Work 
During the 1990s, Carew sold romantic short stories to magazines. Her first book was published in 2004, and her first large publishing deal was with St. Martin's Press in 2007. She mainly publishes erotic work, but also writes science fiction under the pseudonym, Amber Carew. Carew writes around three books a year and enjoys writing about women who are "un-apologetically empowered by their sexuality." Kirkus Reviews writes that "Carew is known for adding a compelling emotional dimension to erotica." They wrote that her 2013 novel, Illicit, was "Not for the faint of heart." His to Possess (2014) is a story that not only focuses on an eventual threesome, but also has an interesting plot, according to Publishers Weekly. In Stepbrother, Mine (2015), the plot deals with taboos relating to incest, but mostly focuses on romance. Carew's 2017 book, A Fare to Remember is an erotic fantasy that includes graphic sex scenes. Publishers Weekly found A Fare to Remember to be "an easy miss."

Selected bibliography

Print 
 Twin Fantasies, St. Martin's Press, 2007. 
 Swing, St. Martin's Press, 2007. 
 Blush, St. Martin's Press, 2008.  
 Six, St. Martin's Press, 2009. 
 Secret Ties, St. Martin's Press, 2009. 
 Forbidden Heat, St. Martin's Press, 2010. 
 Bliss, St. Martin's Press, 2010. 
 Pleasure Bound, St. Martin's Press, 2010. 
 Total Abandon, St. Martin's Press, 2011. 
 Secret Weapon, St. Martin's Press, 2011. 
 Insatiable, St. Martin's Press, 2012. 
 Illicit, St. Martin's Press, 2013.  
 His to Command, St. Martin's Press, 2013. 
 His to Possess, St. Martin's Press, 2014. 
 His to Claim, St. Martin's Press, 2014. 
 Riding Steele, St. Martin's Press, 2015.  (e-book serialization November–December 2014)
 Hard Ride, St. Martin's Griffin, 2015. 
 Stepbrother, Mine, St. Martin's Griffin, 2015. 
 My Best Friend's Stepfather, St. Martin's Press, 2016.  (e-book serialization November 2015)
Nailed, St. Martin's Press, 2016. 
A Fare to Remember, St. Martin's Press, 2017, 
Heat, St. Martin's Press, 2017, 
 X Marks the Spot, St. Martin's Press, 2018. 
Stroke of Luck, St. Martin's Press, 2020.

E-book 
 The King and I, Samhain Publishing, 2005. 
 Christmas Angel, Lachesis Publishing, 2009.
 Crystal Genie, Red Sage Publishing, 2010. 
 The Commander's Woman, Samhain Publishing, 2011. 
 The Male Stripper, Opal Carew, 2011. 
 Three, Opal Carew, 2011. 
 Slaves of Love, Opal Carew, 2011. 
 The Stranger, Opal Carew, 2012. 
 Debt of Honor, Opal Carew, 2012. 
 Passion Play, Sahmain Publishing, 2012. 
 The Office Slave, Opal Carew, 2012. 
 Three Men and a Bride, Opal Carew, 2013. 
 Three Secrets, Opal Carew, 2014. 
 Taken By Storm, Opal Carew, 2014. 
 Hot Ride, Opal Carew, 2014. 
Meat, Swerve, 2016, 
Big Package, Swerve, 2016, 
Drilled, Swerve, 2017.

Writing as Amber Carew 
 Captive Lover, Opal Carew, 2011. 
 Christmas Angel, Opal Carew, 2011. 
 The Cinderella Obsession, Opal Carew, 2011. 
 Magical Dawn, Opal Carew, 2011. 
 Virgin Spy, Opal Carew, 2011. 
 Virgin Wanted, Opal Carew, 2011. 
 Virgin Wizard, Opal Carew, 2011.

References

External links 
 
 Macmillan Publishing: Brief biography.

Living people
Canadian romantic fiction writers
Canadian women novelists
Women romantic fiction writers
Canadian erotica writers
Women erotica writers
Year of birth missing (living people)
21st-century Canadian novelists
21st-century Canadian women writers
21st-century pseudonymous writers